Moshe Chaim Luzzatto (also Moses Chaim, Moses Hayyim, also Luzzato) (1707 – 16 May 1746 (26 Iyar 5506)), also known by the Hebrew acronym RaMCHaL (or RaMHaL), was a prominent Italian Jewish rabbi, kabbalist, and philosopher.

Biography

Early life
Moshe Chaim Luzzatto was born in 1707 in the Jewish ghetto of Padua, Republic of Venice. The son of Jacob Vita and Diamente Luzzatto, he received classical Jewish and Italian education, showing a predilection for literature at a very early age. He may have attended the University of Padua and certainly associated with a group of students there, known to dabble in mysticism and alchemy. With his vast knowledge in religious lore, the arts, and science, he quickly became the dominant figure in that group. His writings demonstrate mastery of the Tanakh, the Talmud, and the rabbinical commentaries and codes of Jewish law.

Poetry and literature
At an early age, he began a thorough study of the Hebrew language and of poetic composition. He wrote epithalamia and elegies, a noteworthy example of the latter being the dirge on the death of his teacher Cantarini, a lofty poem of twenty-four verses written in classical Hebrew. Before age 20, he had begun his composition of 150 hymns modeled on the biblical Psalter. In these psalms, composed in conformity with the laws of parallelism, he freed himself from all foreign influences, imitating the style of the Bible so faithfully that his poems seem entirely a renaissance of biblical words and thoughts. They provoked the criticism of the rabbis, however, and were one of the causes of the persecutions to which Luzzatto was later subjected. R. Jacob Poppers of Frankfort-on-the-Main thought it unpardonable presumption to attempt to equal the "anointed of the God of Jacob". Only two psalms are known of which it can with certainty be said that they belonged to Luzzatto's psalter; in addition seven hymns by him which were sung at the inauguration of the enlarged Spanish synagogue at Padua appeared in the work "Ḥanukkat ha-Maron" (Venice, 1729); but it is not certain whether they were taken from the psalter.

As a youth Luzzatto essayed also dramatic poetry, writing at the age of 17 his first biblical drama, "Shimshon u-Felistim", (of which only fragments have been preserved, in another work of his). This youthful production foreshadows the coming master; it is perfect in versification, simple in language, original and thoughtful in substance. This first large work was followed by the "Leshon Limmudim," a discussion of Hebrew style with a new theory of Hebrew versification, in which the author showed his thorough knowledge of classical rhetoric. It is in a certain sense a scientific demonstration of the neoclassic Italian style, in contrast with the medieval. There is a vast difference between Luzzatto's style, which recalls the simplicity, smoothness, and vigor of the Bible, and the insipid, exaggerated, and affected work of his contemporaries. The book, dedicated to his teacher Bassani, was printed at Mantua 1727, with a text which deviates from the manuscript formerly in the possession of M. S. Ghirondi.

In the same year or somewhat later, Luzzatto wrote his allegorical festival drama "Migdal 'Oz" (or "Tummat Yesharim"), on the occasion of the marriage of his friend Israel Benjamin Bassani. This four-act play, which shows Latin and Italian as well as biblical influence, illustrates the victory of justice over iniquity. It is masterly in versification and melodious in language, the lyrical passages being especially lofty; and it has a wealth of pleasing imagery reminiscent of Guarini's "Pastor Fido." The drama was edited by M. Letteris, and published with notes by S. D. Luzzatto and prolegomena by Franz Delitzsch, Leipsic, 1837.

Controversy
The turning point in Luzzatto's life came at the age of twenty, when he claimed to have received direct instruction from an angel (known as a maggid). While stories of such encounters with celestial entities were not unknown in kabbalistic circles, it was unheard of for someone of such a young age. His peers were enthralled by his written accounts of these "Divine lessons", but the leading Italian rabbinical authorities were highly suspicious and threatened to excommunicate him. Just decades earlier another young mystic, Sabbatai Zevi (1626–1676), had rocked the Jewish world by claiming to be the Messiah. Although, at one point, Zevi had convinced many European and Middle Eastern rabbis of his claim, the episode ended with him recanting and converting to Islam. The global Jewish community was still reeling from that, and the similarities between Luzzatto's writings and Zevi's were perceived as being particularly dangerous and heretical. In some of his revelations Luzzato even described Moses, Abraham and Elijah introducing themselves to him and calling him "my mentor", this infuriated many rabbis, especially Moshe Hagiz, who considered his writings heretical and ordered the burning of all his writings. Other rumors were spread that Luzzato has authored a new book of Psalms that was meant to supplant the Davidic Psalms in the messianic age, a claim which Luzzato and his mentor Yeshayahu Basan have vigorously denied.

These writings, only some of which have survived, are often misunderstood to describe a belief that Luzzatto and his followers were key figures in a messianic drama that was about to take place. In this contentious interpretation, he identified one of his followers as the Messiah, son of David, and assumed for himself the role of Moses, claiming that he was that biblical figure's reincarnation.

Departure from Italy
After threats of excommunication and many arguments, Luzzatto finally came to an understanding with the leading Italian rabbis, including his decision not to write the maggid lessons or teach mysticism and hand over all his writings to his mentor Yeshayahu Basan. In 1735, Luzzatto left Italy for Amsterdam, believing that in the more liberal environment there, he would be able to pursue his mystical interests. Passing through Germany, he appealed to the local rabbinical authorities to protect him from the threats of the Italian rabbis. They refused and forced him to sign a document stating that all the teachings of the maggid were false. 

But the controversy wasn't entirely over yet. Rumors were spread that Luzzato's mentor Yeshayahu Basan sympathized with his pupil and even sent him back some of his writings to publish. This caused a major uproar and many heated letters passed between Moshe Hagiz and Yaakov Poppers and Basan threatening to undermine the latter's authority if he did not hand over the box with Luzzato's writings to the rabbis of Venice. In one letter, Moshe Hagiz, Luzzato's staunchest opponent, calls Luzzato a wretched renegade who betrayed his religion, and lost his portion in the world to come, calling and urging for the burning of all his writings. Basan was forced to hand over Luzzato's writings to Poppers which he subsequently buried deep in the ground and burnt some of the writings he deemed heretical.

Amsterdam
When Luzzatto finally reached Amsterdam, he was able to pursue his Kabbalah studies relatively unhindered. Earning a living as a diamond cutter, he continued writing but refused to teach. It was in this period that he wrote his magnum opus the Mesillat Yesharim (1740), essentially an ethical treatise but with certain mystical underpinnings. The book presents a step-by-step process by which every person can overcome the inclination to sin and might eventually experience a divine inspiration similar to prophecy. Another prominent work, Derekh Hashem (The Way of God) is a concise work on the core theology of Judaism. The same concepts are discussed in brief in a smaller book called Maamar HaIkarim (the English translation of this book is now available on the Web with the title "Essay on Fundamentals"). Da'at Tevunot ("The Knowing Heart") also found its existence in Amsterdam as the missing link between rationality and Kabbalah, a dialogue between the intellect and the soul. On the other hand, Derech Tevunot ("The Way of Understanding") introduces the logic which structures Talmudic debates as a means to understanding the world.

One major rabbinic contemporary who praised Luzzatto's writing was Rabbi Eliyahu of Vilna, the Vilna Gaon (1720–1797), who was considered to be the most authoritative Torah sage of the modern era as well as a great kabbalist himself. He was reputed to have said after reading the Mesillat Yesharim, that were Luzzatto still alive, he would have walked from Vilna to learn at Luzzatto's feet. He stated that having read the work, the first ten chapters contained not a superfluous word.

Luzzatto also wrote poetry and drama. Although most of it is seemingly secular, some scholars claim to have identified mystical undertones in this body of work as well. His writing is strongly influenced by the Jewish poets of Spain and by contemporary Italian authors.

The cantor of the Sephardic synagogue in Amsterdam, Abraham Caceres, worked with Luzzatto to set several of his poems to music.

Acre, Israel
Frustrated by his inability to teach Kabbalah, Luzzatto left Amsterdam for the Holy Land in 1743, settling in Acre. Three years later, he and his family died in a plague.

Legacy

Burial site
Though it is accepted by scholars that his tomb is in Kafr Yasif, where some assume to have identified it, his burial place is traditionally said to be near the Talmudic sage Rabbi Akiva in Tiberias, northern Israel. It is noteworthy that there are many scholars who make some comparison between the Ramchal and Rabbi Akiva. Some believe that the Ramchal is actually a Gilgul (reincarnation) of Rabbi Akiva. Probably also because Kafr Yasif is now an Arab town while Tiberias is Jewish, the Tiberias tomb is the destination of almost all of the pilgrims seeking his final resting place.

Synagogue in Acre
Luzzato's original synagogue in Akko was razed by the city's Bedouin ruler, Zahir al-Umar, in 1758, who built a mosque on top of it. In its place, the Jews of Akko received a small building north of the mosque which still functions as a synagogue and bears Luzzato's name.

Religious writings
A century after his death, Luzzatto was rediscovered by the Musar movement, which adopted his ethical works. It was the great Torah ethicist, Israel Salanter (1810–1883), who placed the Messilat Yesharim at the heart of the Musar (ethics) curriculum of the major yeshivas of Eastern Europe.
Derech Hashem, Luzzato's treatise on Jewish theology, eventually came to be considered as an authoritative guide in Jewish theology, for Jews that have accepted the newer mystical ideas (Kabbalah) as true.

Most of his writings were burned, though some did survive. From the Zoharic writings, the 70 Tikkunim Hadashim re-appeared in 1958 against all odds, in the main library of Oxford. "Arrangements" of thoughts, these Tikkunim expose 70 different essential uses of the last verse of the Humash (the five books of Moses). Supposedly taught word-by-word in Aramaic by Luzzatto's "Maggid," they parallel the Tikunei haZohar ("Rectifications of the Zohar"), ascribed by some to Rabbi Simeon bar Yochai, the Rashbi, which expose the 70 fundamental understandings of the first verse of the Humash (Books of Moses).

Secular literary legacy
The Hebrew writers of the Haskalah, the Jewish expression of the Enlightenment, greatly admired Luzatto's secular writings and deemed him the founder of modern Hebrew literature. His cousin, the poet Ephraim Luzzatto (1729–1792), also exerted genuine influence on the first stirrings of modern Hebrew poetry.

Bibliography
Following are a selection of other books written by RaMChaL:
 Ma'aseh Shimshon ("The Story of Samson")
 Lashon Limudim ("A Tongue for Teaching")
 Migdal Oz ("A Tower of Strength")
 Zohar Kohelet ("The Zohar to the Book of Ecclesiastes")
 Shivim Tikkunim ("Seventy Tikkunim") which parallels the seventy Tikkunei Zohar
 Zohar Tinyanah ("A Second Zohar") no longer exists
 Klallot Haillan or Klalut Hailan ("The Principal Elements of The Tree [of Life]") a synopsis of the ARI's basic work of Kabbalah
 Ma'amar HaShem ("A Discourse on God")
 Ma'amar HaMerkava ("A Discourse on The Chariot")
 Ma'amar Shem Mem-Bet ("A Discourse on the 42 letter Name [of God]")
 Ma'amar HaDin ("A Discourse on [Divine] Judgment")
 Ma'amar HaChochma or Maamar Ha'hokhma ("A Discourse on Wisdom") focuses on Rosh Hashanah, Yom Kippur, and Passover from a Kabbalistic perspective
 Ma'amar HaGeulah ("A Discourse on The Redemption" or "The Great Redemption")
 Ma'amar HaNevuah ("A Discourse on Prophecy")
 Mishkanei Elyon or Mishkane 'Elyon ("Exalted Towers") a Kabbalistic understanding of the Holy Temple with a depiction of the third Temple's dimensions
 Ain Yisrael ("The Well of Israel")
 Ain Yaakov ("The Well of Jacob")
 Milchamot HaShem ("The Wars of God") which defends Kabbalah against its detractors
 Kinnaot HaShem Tzivakot or Kinat H' Tsevaot ("Ardent [Defenses] for The L-rd of Hosts") offers details about the redemption and the Messiah.
 Adir Bamarom ("[God is] Mighty on High") a commentary on the Iddrah Rabbah ("The Great Threshing Room") section of the Zohar
 Iggrot Pitchei Chochma v'Da'at or Klale Pit'he 'Hokhma Veda'at ("Letters [to Serve] as an Opening to Wisdom and Knowledge") spells out and explains certain erudite principles of the Jewish faith according to the Kabbalah
 Sefer Daniel ("The Book of Daniel"), an esoteric commentary to this biblical work
 Tiktu Tephilot ("515 Prayers") focuses on prayers for the revelation of God's sovereignty
 Kitzur Kavvanot ("Abbreviated Intentions") allows the reader an overview of the ARI's recorded prayer-intentions
 Ma'amar HaVechuach ("A Discourse [that serves as] The Argument") pits a Kabbalist against a rationalist as each tries to defend his way of thinking
 Klach Pitchei Chochma or Kala'h Pitkhe 'Hokhma ("138 Openings to Wisdom") one of Ramchal's most important works in that it lays out his thinking about the symbolic nature of the Ari's writings and Ramchal's own explanations of those symbols
 Areichat Klallot HaEilan ("A Dictionary of The Principal Elements to The Tree [of Life]")
 Klallim ("Principal Elements") a series of short and pithy presentations of the main principles of the Kabbalistic system said outright
 Da'at Tevunot or Da'ath Tevunoth ("The Knowing Heart" or "Knowing the Reasons"), a work that explains the duality of positive and negative that exists on all levels of reality, that this is the basis of God's "showing his face/hiding his face" to and from humanity, and the dual existence of good and evil
 Peirush al Midrash Rabbah ("A Commentary on Midrash Rabbah") that is not Kabbalistic so much as symbolic
 Derech Hashem or Derekh HaShem ("The Way of God") one of his best known works: a succinct laying-out of the fundamentals of the Jewish faith touching upon mankind's obligations in this world and its relations to God
 Ma'amar al HaAggadot ("A Discourse on Aggadah") which is an explanation that Aggadic literature is not literal but metaphoric
 Ma'amar HaIkkurim or Maamar Ha'ikarim ("A Discourse on the Fundamentals") a short and succinct laying-out of the fundamentals of the Jewish religion like "The Way of God" that touches upon certain other themes
 Derech Chochma or Sepher Derekh 'Hokhma ("The Way of Wisdom"), which serves as a dialogue between a young person and a sage with the latter setting out a lifetime course of Torah study culminating in the study of Kabbalah 
 Vichuach HaChocham V'HaChassid ("The Argument between the Sage and the Pious Man") which is actually a first draft of Messilat Yesharim that only resurfaced recently
 Messilat Yesharim or Mesilat Yesharim ("The Path of the Just"), his most famous work that enables its readers to grow in piety step by step, was written when he was 33 (in 1740)
 Sefer HaDikduk ("The Book of Grammar")
 Sefer HaHigayon ("The Book of Logic") lays out the correct way to think and analyze
 Ma'amar al HaDrasha ("A Discourse on Homilies") encourages the study of Kabbalah and Mussar
 Sefer Hamalitza ("The Book of Style") offers the art of accurate writing and expression
 Derech Tevunot ("The Way of Understanding") explains the Talmudic way of thinking
 LaYesharim Tehilla ("Praise be to the Upright") is a dramatic work

See also
 History of the Jews in Italy
 Italian Jews
 List of Italian Jews
 Musar literature
 Mussar movement

References

External links

 The official Ramchal site texts - Videos 
 Ramchal books
 About Luzzatto
 Biography of Luzzatto
 Current classes on RAMCHAL on the Internet
 His legacy and Derech Hashem
 Beit Ramhal, continuing his legacy
 The Kabbalah of the Ari za"l according to the Ram`hal
 Excerpt of Derech Etz Chaim by the Ramchal
 MESILAT YESHARIM (Path of the Just) by the Ramchal
 The purpose of life - based on the RAMCHAL
 MP3s of a class that is reading Derech HaShem ("The Way of God")
 Video of Lecture on Ramhal by Dr. Henry Abramson

1707 births
1746 deaths
18th-century Italian rabbis
18th-century Dutch Jews
Moshe Chaim
Rabbis from Padua
Philosophers of Judaism
Rabbis in Ottoman Palestine
Writers of Musar literature
Jewish ethicists
18th-century rabbis from the Ottoman Empire